María Clara Pancha Alonso (born 2 February 1990), known professionally as Clara Alonso,  is an Argentine actress, singer, and television hostess. She debuted as an actress in the 2007 Argentine remake of High School Musical. Since 2007, she has acted in various Disney Channel programs in Latin America. Alonso is best known for her lead role as "Angie Carrara" in the Disney Channel Latin America Series, Violetta.

Early life
María Clara Alonso was born on 2 February 1990 in Rosario, Argentina. Her mother is a pediatrician and pulmonary specialist, and her father is an engineer. She is the oldest child and has two younger brothers named Agustín and Ignacio. At age 2, she and her family moved to Capitán Bermúdez, a smaller city located outside of Rosario. The family later moved to Castelar, a small city near the outskirts of Buenos Aires when she was eight years old. As a child, she practiced gymnastics, swimming, and dance. Alonso played field hockey and volleyball. She attended primary school at Cayetano Errico in Capitán Bermúdez and later graduated high school from Instituto Inmaculada de Castelar in Buenos Aires. At 8, she quit field hockey and asked her parents to enroll her in musical comedy classes at "Broadway Street", an acting school in Haedo, Buenos Aires. She received lessons in tap, acting, and clown while attending. In addition, she participated in several plays such as Alice in Wonderland at the Astral theater.

Acting career

2007–2011: Career beginnings
One month after completing high school in 2007, Alonso decided to pursue an acting career full-time. She unsuccessfully auditioned for spot in a season of Latin American Idol before later attending castings in 2007 for High School Musical: La Selección.  Alonso was one of the twenty people selected to participate in the musical reality competition. The show was broadcast on Channel 13 and on the Disney Channel in Argentina. She was eliminated in the tenth week of competition but was later called back to be a member of a concert tour throughout Argentina. Subsequently, she was also cast in her first acting role as "Clari" in the Argentine film version of High School Musical.

During a tour stop in La Rioja, Argentina for the film's concert, she attracted the attention of Disney Channel Latin America producers who later cast her as a hostess in "Zapping Zone", a youth-targeted celebrity entertainment show for Argentina. She hosted the program alongside Daniel Martins and Carolina Ibarra. Due to the show's success, it began airing in other countries throughout South America.

From 27 April to 2 May 2008, she traveled to Orlando, Florida to participate in the Disney Channel Games 2008. In Latin America, the program aired from September 5 to October 3. She was part of the green team called "The Cyclones", alongside several international Disney stars such as  Jason Dolley, Jennifer Stone, Chelsea Staub, Joe Jonas, Brad Kavanagh, Dylan Sprouse and team captain David Henrie. Her team finished in third place with 55 points.

On 21 October 2008, during a taping of "Zapping Zone", Alonso premiered her debut single, "A mi alrededor" with the collaboration of Sophie Oliver Sanchéz. A music video was also filmed and aired throughout Latin America on Disney Channel. This was her first and only solo single for Walt Disney Records' label.

In 2010, she starred in the Disney Channel mini-series Highway: Rodando la Aventura which is the fourth original production of Disney Channel Latin America. The series tells the story of a group of eight friends in a motorhome traveling throughout Latin America. Alonso played a young perfectionist, who was obsessed with cleanliness and order. That same year she began working as a voice-over actress on the Spanish-language version of the Disney Channel series Pecezuelos.

In August 2010, she traveled to São Paulo, Brazil to shoot a two-part episode for the Disney Channel series, "Cuando toca la campana", which is based on the original US version, As the Bell Rings. She played Jennifer, a new student in the final days of the school year. The first part of the episode aired on Disney Channel on 1 December 2011, while the second part of the episode was aired on 8 December 2011. After spending more than four years on "Zapping Zone", Alonso announced her departure from the show on 12 August 2011.

2012–2016: "Violetta" success and international breakout
In March 2012, she appeared in an episode in the Disney XD series Latin America show, "Peter Punk", where she played "Piranha", a very determined teenage punk. In late 2011, she was cast as "Angie", the estranged aunt and music teacher of the title character, in the tween musical Disney Channel series, Violetta. Alonso also lent her vocals to several recordings featured on the series first and second seasons. Filming for both seasons occurred in Buenos Aires, Argentina. The show was also filmed additional scenes in Madrid, Spain for the second season. The television series was an international hit and aired in several countries on Disney Channel networks across Europe, Africa, Australia, and New Zealand.

In February 2014, Alonso began rehearsals for the musical theatre production Groupie in Buenos Aires. The play is based on Beatles songs and their cultural and social impact in Buenos Aires in 1963. It premiered at The Cavern in Buenos Aires on 4 June  2014. Alonso played "Sandra" in the production. On 21 March 2014, Alonso confirmed with fans via her official Twitter account that she would continue playing "Angie" for the third season of Violetta.

While on a break from filming Violetta, Alonso visited Italy for the first time and toured Rome. Because of the television show's popularity in Italy, she contacted an Italian acting agency, looking for professional representation.
During March and April 2014, she traveled to Milan, Italy, to film Angie e le ricette di Violetta ("Angie and Violetta's recipes" in English), a special cooking v-log mini-series based on Violetta.  The role was Alonso's first Italian-speaking part, and the series' first season consisted of 20 episodes. After filming the mini-series, Alonso returned to Argentina to work on the third and final season of Violetta.  Angie e le ricette di Violetta premiered on June 9, 2014, on the Disney Channel in Italy. In late November 2014, Violetta concluded production on its third and final season in Buenos Aires. The third season premiered in Argentina on 28 July 2014. The series finale aired on 6 February 2015 in Argentina.

For one week in mid-January 2015, Alonso filmed the second season of Angie e le ricette di Violetta in Milan, Italy. Following the conclusion of production on the series, she revealed to fans via her official Facebook page that the show marked her final project with Disney after an eight-year career with the network.

In June 2015, she shot the Spanish-language short film, Jazmin de invierno ("Jasmine's Winter" in English) in Buenos Aires. A trailer was released in July 2015 on her official YouTube channel. The project is her first post-Disney role. The film was later released on YouTube in late November 2015. In mid-July, she travelled to Rome, Italy to begin filming the web series, Lontana da me ("Far away from me" in English). The web mini series completed filming in early August 2015. On November 17, 2015, the series premiered for streaming on Rai 1's official website. In mid-September 2015, it was revealed that Alonso would take part in the film, Tini, el gran cambio de Violetta, a continuation of the TV series,  Violetta. The movie began filming on location in Sicily on 7 October 2015. Additional scenes were filmed in Taormina, Italy, Rome, Madrid, Buenos Aires, and Cádiz, Spain. Filming concluded in mid-December 2015. The film was later released in Europe and Latin America during May 2016. It premiered in Argentina on 2 June 2016.

2017 to present
For several days in early February 2017, Alonso filmed the short movie, "Insane Love", directed by Italian filmmaker, Eitan Pitigliani, in Rome, Italy. In late July 2017, she travelled to Rome to begin filming the Italian comedy movie, "Il Tuttofare". Production ended in early September 2017. The film was released in Italy on April 19, 2018. Later that year, Alonso was cast in the Spanish web mini-series, "In the Mood"; the program's first season consisted of four episodes and premiered on YouTube on August 30, 2017.

In early March 2018, Alonso filmed a small role in the Spanish drama movie, "@buelos", in Madrid. The film is expected to be released in Spanish cinemas in November 2018. She was also cast in the Spanish one act play, "La memoria", which ran for 15 minutes showings in Madrid in late April for several days.

In May 2018, it was announced that Alonso had been cast in a role in the upcoming Argentine crime television series, "Campanas en la noche". The show, which is slated to have 80 episodes began production in late May in Buenos Aires and Villa La Angostura. Filming ended in late November 2018. The program will premiere on Telefe in Argentina on 14 January 2019.

In 2021, Alonso portrayed present-day Caterina Sharp in the Disney+ original Entrelazados (Intertwined).

Other ventures
On 26 January 2015, Alonso was announced as a contestant on third season of the reality competition Notti sul ghiaccio ("Nights on Ice" in English) for the Italian network Rai 1. The competition pairs celebrities with professional ice skaters. Alonso trained for the competition in Rome, performing a new routine each week. The season premiered on February 21, 2015, and aired Saturday evenings in Italy on Rai 1. The competition ended on March 21, 2015, where Alonso and her partner, Marco Garavaglia, finished in 3rd place out of 11 contestants.

In October 2016, she and then-boyfriend, Spanish actor Diego Domínguez, were announced as cast members and partners for the Italian dance competition reality show, "Dance, Dance, Dance". The show premiered on Fox Life in Italy on 21 December 2016. It featured contestants recreating dances from popular music videos, musicals, and films. On March 15, 2017, Alonso and Domínguez won first season of "Dance, Dance, Dance".

Personal life
At 19, she moved out of her family's home in Castelar to Buenos Aires, where she lived on her own for several years. In November 2015, she moved to Madrid, Spain to continue pursuing her acting career. Besides Spanish she speaks English and Italian fluently. In 2013, she began learning Italian in order to work in Italy. In late 2012, she began dating Spanish actor Diego Domínguez, who she co-starred with in Violetta. They ended their relationship in early 2018. She moved back to Buenos Aires in May 2018 following her casting in the Argentine TV show, "Campanas de la noche". She holds Argentine and Italian citizenship. Her great-grandparents were from Marche, Italy. She resides in the Palermo neighborhood of Buenos Aires.

Filmography

Films

Television

Theatre

Music video appearances

Discography 
Singles
2008: ″A mi alrededor″

Soundtracks albums
2010: Highway: Rodando la aventura

Promotional singles
″¡Ven ya!″
″Amigas por siempre″
″La voz″

Tour appearances
2007: "Actuar, Bailar, Cantar": "High School Musical: La Selección" (Featured singer/dancer)
2010: Jonas Brothers Live in Concert World Tour" (Highway: Rodando la aventura opening act for Colombia, Chile, and Argentina)
2011: "A Year Without Rain" (Highway: Rodando la aventura opening act for Argentina)

References

External links 

Italian Talent Agency Profile
Spain Talent Agency Profile

1990 births
Living people
21st-century Argentine women singers
Argentine people of Italian descent
Argentine television actresses
Actresses from Rosario, Santa Fe
Singers from Rosario, Santa Fe